Boomerang Beach is a locality and beach in the township of Pacific Palms, New South Wales, 282km (175mi) by road north of Sydney. The 1.45 km beach is surrounded by the Booti Booti National Park and backed by dune vegetation. 

Marine mammals such as whales, sharks and dolphins frequent the water. 

Recreational activities include swimming, surfing, fishing as well as snorkelling. This beach is only patrolled in summer and has moderately hazardous surf, several drownings have been recorded at the Boomerang.

References

External links
 https://beachsafe.org.au/beach/nsw/great-lakes/blueys-beach/blueys - Basic Information

Beaches of New South Wales
Suburbs of Mid-Coast Council
Localities in New South Wales
Coastal towns in New South Wales